The OUTEast Film Festival is an annual film festival in Halifax, Nova Scotia, which programs a lineup of LGBT-related films. Launched in 2012, the event is staged in June of each year at a variety of venues, including the Nova Scotia Museum of Natural History and the Halifax Central Library.

Andria Wilson, one of the founders of the festival, became director of the Inside Out Film and Video Festival in Toronto, Ontario, in 2016.

See also
 List of LGBT film festivals
 List of film festivals in Canada

References

External links

Film festivals in Nova Scotia
Festivals in Halifax, Nova Scotia
LGBT film festivals in Canada
Film festivals established in 2012
2012 establishments in Nova Scotia
LGBT in Nova Scotia